Grace Hamilton was an American politician.

Grace Hamilton may also refer to:

Grace Hamilton, character in The Godfather Part III
Grace Hamilton, character in The Love Hermit
Grace Hamilton, known as Spice (musician), Jamaican dancehall artist
Grace Hamilton (rugby), Australian rugby union player
Grace L. Hamilton, American artist (1894-1992)